Dancing at Lughnasa is a 1998 Irish-British-American period drama film adapted from the 1990 Brian Friel play Dancing at Lughnasa, directed by Pat O'Connor.

The film competed in the Venice Film Festival of 1998. It won an Irish Film and Television Award for Best Actor in a Female Role by Brid Brennan. It was also nominated for 6 other awards, including the Irish Film and Television Award for Best Feature Film and the Best Actress Award for Meryl Streep.

Cast and characters
 Meryl Streep – Kate Mundy
 Michael Gambon – Father Jack Mundy
 Catherine McCormack – Christina Mundy
 Kathy Burke – Maggie Mundy
 Sophie Thompson – Rose Mundy
 Bríd Brennan – Agnes Mundy
 Rhys Ifans – Gerry Evans
 Darrell Johnston – Michael Mundy
 Lorcan Cranitch – Danny Bradley
 Peter Gowen – Austin Morgan
 Dawn Bradfield – Sophie McLoughlin
 Marie Mullen – Vera McLoughlin
 John Kavanagh – Father Carlin
 Kate O'Toole – Chemist

Reception and awards
Although the film received average reviews (60% 'Fresh' rating on Rotten Tomatoes from 35 reviews), most critics praised the performances of the entire cast. Janet Maslin, critic of the New York Times said that "Meryl Streep has made many a grand acting gesture in her career, but the way she simply peers out a window in Dancing at Lughnasa ranks with the best. Everything the viewer need know about Kate Mundy, the woman she plays here, is written on that prim, lonely face and its flabbergasted gaze." Peter Travis of Rolling Stone magazine wrote that "a luminous cast reveals long-buried feelings. Meryl Streep finds the expansive soul behind prim schoolteacher Kate. And she is matched by Kathy Burke's bawdy Maggie, Brid Brennan's secretive Agnes, Sophie Thompson's slow-witted Rose and Catherine McCormack's bold Christina, who never married the father of her son."

Kathy Burke received a nomination for Best Supporting Actress – Drama from the International Press Academy (Satellite Awards).

Mementos from the filming are on display at the St. Connell's Museum in Glenties.

References

External links
 
 
 
 
 

Irish drama films
1998 films
1998 drama films
British films based on plays
American films based on plays
American drama films
Films directed by Pat O'Connor
Films set in Ireland
British drama films
1990s English-language films
1990s American films
1990s British films